"The Parent Trap" was the title song from the 1961 Disney film, The Parent Trap. It was sung by teen idols, Annette Funicello and Tommy Sands and it was written by the songwriting brother team of Robert and Richard Sherman.

According to the Sherman Brothers, they raised a concern with Walt Disney when they were given the assignment to write this song. The songwriters believed that it would prove difficult to enunciate the two letter "t"s, one immediately following the other (i.e. "ParenT Trap" would prove difficult to say quickly.) Nevertheless, Disney wanted to keep the title of the film and so the music underneath the title line of the song compensates for this problem by putting a short break between the words.

References 
 Sherman, Robert B. Walt's Time: from before to beyond. Santa Clarita: Camphor Tree Publishers, 1998.

Songs about parenthood
1961 singles
Disney songs
Annette Funicello songs
Songs written by the Sherman Brothers
Songs written for films
 
1961 songs